Anselmo Alfredo Aieta (November 5, 1896 - September 25, 1964) was an Argentine bandoneon musician, composer and occasional actor.

Alfredo De Angelis started in Aieta's orchestra as a pianist. He replaced there Juan Polito. At the same time, Juan d'Arienzo played violin in the same orchestra.

Filmography
1924 - Mientras Buenos Aires duerme (actor)
1937 - Los Locos del cuarto piso (actor/musician)

External links

References

1896 births
1964 deaths
Argentine bandoneonists
Argentine tango musicians
Musicians from Buenos Aires
Burials at La Chacarita Cemetery